Randolph may refer to:

Places

In the United States
 Randolph, Alabama, an unincorporated community
 Randolph, Arizona, a populated place
 Randolph, California, a village merged into the city of Brea
 Randolph, Illinois, an unincorporated community
 Randolph, Indiana, an unincorporated community
 Randolph, Iowa, a city
 Randolph, Kansas, a city
 Randolph, Maine, a town and a census-designated place
 Randolph, Massachusetts, a city
 Randolph, Minnesota, a city
 Randolph, Mississippi, an unincorporated community
 Randolph, Missouri, a city
 Randolph, Nebraska, a city
 Randolph, New Hampshire, a town
 Randolph, New Jersey, a township
 Randolph, New York, a town
 Randolph (CDP), New York
 Randolph, Oregon, an unincorporated community
 Randolph, Pennsylvania, an unincorporated community
 Randolph, South Dakota, an unincorporated community
 Randolph, Tennessee, an unincorporated community
 Randolph, Texas, an unincorporated community
 Randolph, Utah, a town
 Randolph, Vermont, a New England town
 Randolph (CDP), Vermont, the main village in the town
 Randolph, Virginia, an unincorporated community in Charlotte County
 Randolph, Richmond, Virginia, a historically black middle-class neighborhood of Richmond
 Randolph, Wisconsin, a village
 Randolph (town), Wisconsin
 Randolph Township, Dakota County, Minnesota
 Randolph Township, Crawford County, Pennsylvania
 Randolph Air Force Base, Texas
 Randolph County (disambiguation), several in the U.S.
 Fort Randolph (disambiguation)

Elsewhere
 Randolph, Manitoba, Canada, a small community
 Fort Randolph (Panama), a Coast Artillery Corps fort guarding the Panama Canal

People
 Randolph (given name)
 Randolph (surname)
 Randolph family of Virginia

Ships
 Randolph (ship), a merchant ship that carried settlers to Christchurch, New Zealand
 , two ships of the United States Navy

Hotels
 Randolph Hotel, Oxford, England ("The Randolph")
 Randolph Hotel (Des Moines, Iowa), listed on the National Register of Historic Places in Iowa, also known as the Hotel Randolph
 Randolph Hotel (Chicago), temporary name of the former Bismarck Hotel in Chicago, now Hotel Allegro

Schools
 Randolph College, a private liberal arts and sciences college in Lynchburg, Virginia
 Randolph College for the Performing Arts, a private career college in Toronto, Ontario, Canada
 Randolph School, a college preparatory school in Huntsville, Alabama
 Randolph School (Richmond, Virginia), on the National Register of Historic Places

Other uses
 Randolph Street, Chicago, Illinois, United States
 Millennium Station (formerly called Randolph Street Station), a commuter rail terminal in Chicago
 Randolph Road, a county highway in Maryland, United States
 Randolph Engineering, an American eyewear company

See also
 Randolph/Wabash station, a rapid transit station in Chicago
 Randolph/Wells station, a railway station in Chicago